Slagle-Byers House is a historic home located at Westminster, Carroll County, Maryland.  It is a two-story gable-roofed Flemish bond brick structure with a two-story rear wing.  It was constructed about 1819.

It was listed on the National Register of Historic Places in 2007.

References

External links
, including photo from 2004, at Maryland Historical Trust

Houses on the National Register of Historic Places in Maryland
Houses in Carroll County, Maryland
Houses completed in 1819
Westminster, Maryland
National Register of Historic Places in Carroll County, Maryland